Tingena aletis is a species of moth in the family Oecophoridae. It is endemic to New Zealand and has been collected in the vicinity of Arthur's Pass in the South Island. Adults are on the wing in January.

Taxonomy
This species was first described by Edward Meyrick in 1905, using a male specimen he collected at Arthur's Pass at 3000 ft in January, and named Hypercallia aletis. In 1915 Meyrick placed this species within the genus Philobota. George Hudson discussed this species under the name Philobota aletis in his 1928 publication The butterflies and moths of New Zealand. In 1988 J. S. Dugdale placed this species within the genus Tingena. The male holotype is held in the New Zealand Arthropod Collection.

Description 
This species was described by Meyrick as follows:
This species was regarded by both Meyrick and Hudson as being obscure.

Distribution 

This species is endemic to New Zealand.

Behaviour 
Adults of this species are on the wing in January.

References

Oecophoridae
Moths of New Zealand
Moths described in 1905
Endemic fauna of New Zealand
Taxa named by Edward Meyrick
Endemic moths of New Zealand